Colm Markey (born 3 January 1972) is an Irish politician who has been a Member of the European Parliament (MEP) from Ireland for the Midlands–North-West constituency since November 2020. He is a member of Fine Gael, part of the European People's Party.

Political career
He is a member of the European Parliament Committee on Agriculture and Rural Development (AGRI) and a substitute on the Committee on Transport and Tourism (TRAN), the Committee on Fisheries (PECH), the Committee of Inquiry on the Protection of Animals during Transport (ANIT) and the Delegation for relations with Mercosur (DMER). 

Markey was a member of Louth County Council from 2009 to 2020. He is a former president of Macra na Feirme. In November 2020, he replaced Mairead McGuinness as an MEP in the European Parliament following her appointment as European Commissioner.

References

External links

Living people
1982 births
Local councillors in County Louth
Politicians from County Louth
Irish farmers
Fine Gael MEPs
MEPs for the Republic of Ireland 2019–2024